The 1st Canadian Screen Awards were held on March 3, 2013, to honour achievements in Canadian film, television, and digital media production in 2012. This was the inaugural Canadian Screen Awards ceremony, following the Academy of Canadian Cinema & Television's decision, announced in 2012, to merge its formerly separate Genie Awards (for film) and Gemini Awards (for television) into a single ceremony. In addition, the Canadian Screen Awards include awards for achievements in digital media.

Nominations were announced on January 15, 2013. The awards ceremony was hosted by Martin Short.

Ratings
The program was watched by 756,000 Canadian viewers, approximately double the typical ratings for Genie or Gemini ceremonies in recent years.

Film

Television

Programs

Actors

News

Sports

Craft awards

Directing

Music

Writing

Digital media

Multiple nominations and awards

Special awards
Several special awards were given:
Academy Achievement Award: Jeanne Beker
Academy Special Film Award: Victor Loewy
Canada's Screen Star: Amber Marshall
Digital Media Trailblazing Award: Andra Sheffer
Exceptional Achievement in Canadian Film & Television: Ian Greenberg
Gordon Sinclair Award: Laurier LaPierre
Margaret Collier Award: Heather Conkie
Outstanding Artistic Contribution to Film & Television: Kim Cattrall
Outstanding Technical Achievement Award: IMAX Corporation

References

External links
Canadian Screen Awards

2013 in Canadian cinema
2012 film awards
2012 television awards
01
2012 awards in Canada